Romance & the Stage is an album by Elaine Paige, released in 1993.

It was produced by Peter Matz and recorded at CTS Studios, London. The recording features songs primarily taken from stage musicals of the 1930s and 1940s, such as Annie Get Your Gun and Kismet.

The album was released by RCA Records and distributed in the United Kingdom by BMG.

Track listing

 "They Say It's Wonderful/I Got Lost in His Arms" – 4.55 (Irving Berlin)
 "As Time Goes By"  – 4.47 (Herman Hupfeld)
 "Feeling Good" – 4.52 (Leslie Bricusse/Anthony Newley)
 "More Than You Know"  – 3.41 (William Rose/Edward Eliscu/Vincent Youmans)
 "With Every Breath I Take" – 3.36 (Cy Coleman/David Zippel)
 "Mad About the Boy"  – 5.54 (Noël Coward)
 "I Gaze in Your Eyes" – 3.40 (Cole Porter/Ann Hampton Callaway)
 "Kismet Suite: Stranger in Paradise/He's in Love/And This Is My Beloved" – 5.18 (Robert Wright/George Forrest)
 "Long Before I Knew You"  – 3.55 (Jule Styne/Betty Comden/Adolph Green)
 "How Long Has This Been Going On?" – 3.42 (George Gershwin/Ira Gershwin)
 "Smoke Gets in Your Eyes"  – 3.41 (Jerome Kern/Otto Harbach)
 "September Song" – 3.48 (Maxwell Anderson/Kurt Weill)
 "Song of a Summer Night" – 2.29 (Frank Loesser)

Credits

Personnel 
Elaine Paige – vocals
Mike Moran – piano
Harold Fisher – drums
Paul Keogh – guitar
Chris Laurence – bass
Paul Morgan – bass
Frank Ricotti – percussion
Don Lusher – trombone
Jim Hughes – harmonica
Dave Bishop – tenor saxophone
Andy Mackintosh – soprano saxophone
Jack Emblow – musette
New World Philharmonic Orchestra

Production
Producer, orchestrator and conductor – Peter Matz
Executive Producers – Deke Arlon and Elaine Paige
Orchestra Manager – David Katz
Music preparation – Jeremy Thale
Musical associate to the producer – Kevin Townend
Recorded at CTS Studios
Engineer – Steve Price
Assistant Engineer – Andy Taylor
Mixer – Mike Moran
Mix engineer – Tony Taverner
Assistant mix engineer – James Brown
Mastered at the Townhouse
Mastering engineer – Ian Cooper

Charts

References

Elaine Paige albums
1993 albums